The 1988 Ariadne Classic was a women's tennis tournament played on grass courts at the Milton Tennis Centre in Brisbane, Australia and was part of the Category 2 tier of the 1988 WTA Tour. The tournament ran from 28 December 1987 through 3 January 1988. First-seeded Pam Shriver won the singles title.

Finals

Singles

 Pam Shriver defeated  Jana Novotná 7–6(8–6), 7–6(7–4)
 It was Shriver's 1st title of the year and the 104th of her career.

Doubles

 Betsy Nagelsen /  Pam Shriver defeated  Claudia Kohde-Kilsch /  Helena Suková 2–6, 7–5, 6–2
 It was Nagelsen's 1st title of the year and the 16th of her career. It was Shriver's 2nd title of the year and the 105th of her career.

External links
 ITF tournament edition details
 Tournament draws

Ariadne Classic
Danone Hardcourt Championships
Aria
Ariadne Classic, 1988
Ariadne Classic
Ariadne Classic
Sports competitions in Brisbane
Tennis in Queensland